Hadja Djakagbè Kaba is a Guinean politician who represents the constituency of Kankan, in the National Assembly (Guinea). She is a member of the Majority Rally of the Guinean People Party of former president Alpha Conde.

References

Members of the National Assembly (Guinea)
Living people
Year of birth missing (living people)
People from Kankan Region